Askal (portmanteau of asong kalye, meaning "street dog"), also called aspin (portmanteau of asong Pinoy, meaning "Filipino dog"), is the Filipino language name for mongrel dogs in the Philippines. These dogs are either entirely descended from dogs that are indigenous to the Philippines, or are mixed-breed.

Names 

By the late 20th century, dogs commonly seen wandering the streets were called "askal", a Tagalog-derived portmanteau of asong kalye, which literally means street dog. In 2007, the Philippine Animal Welfare Society (PAWS) suggested the alternative term "aspin", short for asong Pinoy (Pinoy dog) to avoid the stigma associated with the term "askal".

In Cebuano, dogs are called irong Bisaya, which literally means "Visayan dog" or "native dog", implying that these are not thought of as a mixed-breed dog so much as unbred mongrels with no purebred ancestors. This is only from a Visayan point of view since irong Bisaya does not differ in character or physical appearance from the other askals found in the Philippines. Physically, the dogs have "all shapes, configurations and sizes."

Appearance
Aspins do not have clear lineages that contributed to what they look like today because they are bred from a diversity of mutts and mixed breeds that are roaming around Philippines streets. However, they have characteristics that distinctively identify them.

The coat can be short haired or rough. Coat colors ranges from Black, Brown, White (commonly), Ginger (rare), Brindle, Gray, and Cream. Spots are commonly found at the base of the tail and at the back in semi-circular fashion. The snout sometimes appears black if the coat color is brown. The tail is usually held high and the ears can be floppy, semi-floppy or fully pointing upwards. The bone structure of a native Askal is on the medium range, never heavy like in Rottweilers.

Interactions with humans

Askals is the Filipino word for stray mixed-breed, indigenous dogs. There are over twelve million strays in the Philippines. Many consider it a problem because these dogs can go without much food or shelter their entire lives. The term "askals" can also refer to a domesticated, indigenous mixed-breed dog. They have been raised traditionally as guard dogs. They are naturally suspicious of strangers, independent and protective of family members. They are good to young children as companions, due to their devotion to family members.

They are trusted by their owners to roam markets or the neighborhood to socialize with other dogs which is why some domesticated dogs are seen by the Western people as stray dogs when in fact they may not be. They are, however, expected to be home before dusk, especially males who always look for females in heat. Female dogs do usually stay home and are excellent watch dogs.

Askals were allowed to compete in the First Philippine Dog Agility Championships in 2013. At the 2015 Pet Express Doggie Run in Pasay, askals were the featured dog. The dogs featured in an essay by Gilda Cordero-Fernando. Askals have been trained by the Coast Guard to identify bombs and drugs by scent.

Notable askals
Kabang, an askal who lost its snout while saving two young children
 Buboy, waited of his owner who had already died several days before. However, Buboy died after being run over by a vehicle.
Boonrod (askal Dog), was found paddling near a rig 130 miles (220 kilometers) off the coast of Thailand.

In popular culture 
The Philippines national football team has been named as "the Azkals", an alternate spelling of "askal".

This is also referenced in a satirical educational institution and Internet meme named the "International State College of the Philippines" as 'Blue Aspins'

See also
List of dog breeds

Notes

References 

Dog types
Dog breeds originating in the Philippines
Animal breeds originating in the Philippines
Mixed-breed dogs
Mammals of the Philippines
Philippines
Tagalog words and phrases